Michael J. Lebowitz (born August 21, 1977) is a Washington, D.C., attorney and expert in the field of military law and Military Expression. Along with being an advocate for veterans' issues, he has published a number of legal articles on First Amendment issues pertaining to the military as well as the field of national security and war crimes. In 2009, he became a prosecutor in the Military Commission for the terrorism and war crimes suspects detained in Guantanamo Bay, Cuba.

Background 
Born in Cleveland, Ohio, Lebowitz has a journalism degree from Kent State University (1999) and a Juris Doctor degree from Case Western Reserve University School of Law (2003). In 2005–2006, he served in Iraq as a Pathfinder with the 101st Airborne Division, where he helped capture foreign fighters. After returning from Iraq, he began advocating on behalf of military families and veterans. Lebowitz continues to serve as a military lawyer in the Judge Advocate General's Corps of the Virginia National Guard.

Military law 
Lebowitz is an attorney in the field of military law and specializes in military free speech where he served as defense counsel in a number of cases where uniformed personnel faced discipline for speech-related activities. Lebowitz has worked on trials involving military freedom and expression. He lectures on the subject and is asked to serve as a media resource on the impact technology continues to play in the field of military free speech. More recently, he has written on the subject of war crimes and national security, and has served as a war crimes prosecutor at Guantanamo Bay.

Political activities 
Lebowitz is a founder of the Modern Whig Party, an organization originally created in 2008 as an advocacy forum for military families and veterans. This centrist organization professes to offer common-sense approaches to government, rather than ideology. In March 2010, the Modern Whig Party was named by Time as among the "top 10 most popular political movements worldwide". Since 2009, Lebowitz ceased activity with the organization upon entering government service.

References 

1977 births
Living people
Lawyers from Cleveland
American male journalists
United States Army personnel of the Iraq War
Case Western Reserve University School of Law alumni
Kent State University alumni
Lawyers from Washington, D.C.
Journalists from Ohio
National Guard (United States) officers
Virginia National Guard personnel
United States Army soldiers